The name Tanya has been used for three tropical cyclones worldwide.

Atlantic Ocean: 
 Hurricane Tanya (1995), Category 1 hurricane that meandered around the central Atlantic

Australian Region:
 Cyclone Tanya (1985), made landfall in Queensland and then in the Northern Territory

Western Pacific Ocean: 
 Typhoon Tanya (1999) (T9919, 17W), never threatened land. 

Atlantic hurricane set index articles
Pacific typhoon set index articles
Australian region cyclone set index articles